Anaerostipes caccae  is a Gram-variable, anaerobic saccharolytic, rod-shaped butyrate-producing and acetate and lactate-utilising bacterium from the genus of Anaerostipes which has been isolated from human faeces.

References

Further reading

External links
Type strain of Anaerostipes caccae at BacDive -  the Bacterial Diversity Metadatabase	

Lachnospiraceae
Bacteria described in 2002